This article has been translated from the original French version.

Trafic.musique was a French television series that was on occasionally.  It featured different types of unusual music, and was shown in Metropolitan France on France 2; in Canada, on TV5 Québec Canada.  The show was presented and produced by Guillaume Durand.  The first episode was broadcast 26 October 2002; the last one, 22 December 2005.  The best parts of the show have since been incorporated into the French television series Campus.

External links (both in French)
 Dossier in L'Express on the show
 Trafic musique on TV5 Québec Canada

Categories (also in French)
Music television series
Programs broadcast on France 2

French music television series